Vadakkumbhagom  is a village in Ernakulam district in the Indian state of Kerala.

Demographics
 India census, Vadakkumbhagom had a population of 11584 with 5670 males and 5914 females.

References

Villages in Ernakulam district